BriLife, also known as IIBR-100, is a replication-competent recombinant VSV viral vectored COVID-19 vaccine candidate. It was developed by the Israel Institute for Biological Research (IIBR). The IIBR partnered with the US-based NRx Pharmaceuticals to complete clinical trials and commercialize the vaccine. A study conducted in hamsters suggested that one dose of the vaccine was safe and effective at protecting against COVID-19.

References

External links 
 IIBR-100 entry at Stanford Medicine
 Evaluate the Safety, Immunogenicity and Potential Efficacy of an rVSV-SARS-CoV-2-S Vaccine

Clinical trials
Israeli COVID-19 vaccines
Science and technology in Israel
Viral vector vaccines
Drugs not assigned an ATC code